Histoires Drôles et Drôles de Gens is a 1983 comedy film directed by Jean-Pierre Dikongué Pipa.

Synopsis
An African storyteller humorously and kindly talks about how some of his fellow countrymen are emulating the habits of white people and "Their stuff". He thus presents several cases to prove his point. In one of them a supposed to be planter and businessman who underpays an employee gets framed by his own folks. A young boy jumps from a high tree with an open umbrella to copy the way the parachutists do in the city. A few other examples are as pathetic or comical. At the epilogue our storyteller finds himself being laughed at, at a bistro in Paris. The way he deals with the situation is kind and again humorous.

This was the last film directed by Jean-Pierre Dikongué Pipa and it was lost for around two decades.

Bibliography
 Armes, Roy, ´Dictionary of African filmmakers´, Indiana University Press, 2008, p. 148

See also
Jean Pierre Dikongue-Pipa
History of Cinema in Cameroon

External links
Histoires Drôles et Drôles de Gens - IMDb page about Histoires Drôles et Drôles de Gens
  Article (in French) in) no Africultures
 Article (in French) in Africiné

1983 films
Cameroonian comedy films
1980s French-language films
1983 comedy films